Jiří Kabele (born 17 February 1987) is a Czech football midfielder, who plays for the Hungarian club Egri

External links

References

1987 births
Living people
Footballers from Prague
Czech footballers
Association football midfielders
Czech First League players
SK Kladno players
FC Sellier & Bellot Vlašim players
FK Varnsdorf players
FC DAC 1904 Dunajská Streda players
Egri FC players
Slovak Super Liga players
Nemzeti Bajnokság I players
Czech expatriate footballers
Expatriate footballers in Slovakia
Expatriate footballers in Hungary
Czech expatriate sportspeople in Slovakia
Czech expatriate sportspeople in Hungary